AmeriMark Direct is an American privately held mail order and direct marketing company founded in 1969 and based in Cleveland, Ohio, United States.  It operates 10 catalogs and 7 websites and specializes in ladies apparel, shoes, jewelry and accessories, perfumes, fragrances and cosmetics, diet and weight loss, personal care products, As Seen on TV products and housewares. The company has about $400 million in annual revenue and employs 700 in the Cleveland suburbs of Middleburg Heights, Ohio and Berea, Ohio.
The company is a member of the American Catalog Mailers Association.

Company history
The company was founded in 1969 by Avvy Katz when he established Anthony Richards, a women's apparel catalog featuring a variety of affordable clothing. Katz subsequently acquired two additional catalogs – Beauty Boutique and Windsor Collection.  The Beauty Boutique catalog contained numerous beauty products including popular perfumes and fragrances while the Windsor Collection featured value-priced fashion jewelry.  In 1995, Katz started a discount healthcare catalog titled Healthy Living.
In 1998, Gary Giesler and his partners acquired Katz's company which became TransAmerica Holdings.  Two years later in 2000, the company was renamed AmeriMark Direct.  At this time, AmeriMark Direct established a shoe catalog titled Complements, which was a spin-off from the Anthony Richards catalog.  In addition, the company launched its first website – AmeriMark.com
In 2005, a private equity firm acquired a 75% stake in AmeriMark Direct.  During this year, the company launched a new catalog titled Time For Me which featured upscale relaxation items as well as diet, fitness, foot care and intimacy products.  The companion website, TimeForMeCatalog.com was also established at this time.  Also in 2005, the company created a second spin-off from Anthony Richards called Essentials. This catalog offered a variety of intimate apparel items including women's pajamas, bras, briefs and panties.

In 2006, the company acquired the Feel Good Store catalog, along with the companion website FeelGoodStore.com and launched BeautyBoutique.com to support its namesake catalog.
In December 2007, the company formed AmeriMark Holdings which acquired Dr. Leonard's Healthcare Corp. located in Edison, New Jersey with additional operations in Lincoln, Nebraska.   AmeriMark Holdings also became the parent company for AmeriMark Direct at this time. Dr. Leonard's, which was founded in 1980, is a direct marketer of health products, As Seen on TV, clothing, collectibles, exercise equipment, home furnishings, housewares and shoes for senior citizens.   Dr. Leonard's markets through two catalog titles, Dr.Leonard's and Carol Wright Gifts, and related websites Dr.Leonards.com and CarolWrightGifts.com
AmeriMark ranked #296 in the Internet Retail Top 500 Guide in 2007.

References

Further reading
 Cleveland Plains Dealer -  AmeriMark Direct president wonders how his catalogs will collect sales taxes under the Marketplace Fairness Act

External links 
 

Online retailers of the United States
American companies established in 1969
Retail companies established in 1969
Mail-order retailers
Companies based in Cleveland